Abdoulaye Diarra (born 28 December 1994) is a Malian international footballer who plays for Maghreb de Fès.

International career

International goals
Scores and results list Mali's goal tally first.

References

External links 
 
 Abdoulaye Diarra at Footballdatabase

1994 births
Living people
Malian footballers
Association football midfielders
2015 Africa U-23 Cup of Nations players
CO de Bamako players
Ittihad Tanger players
Rapide Oued Zem players
Maghreb de Fès players
Mali international footballers
21st-century Malian people
Botola players
Malian expatriate footballers
Expatriate footballers in Morocco
Malian expatriate sportspeople in Morocco
Mali A' international footballers
2016 African Nations Championship players